Gorban may refer to:

People

 Alexander Nikolaevich Gorban, a scientist
 Andrei Gorban,  a professional tennis player
 Boris Gorban, an athlete
 Valeriy Gorban,  a rally driver

Places

Gorban, a commune in Iaşi County, Romania
Gorban, Qasr-e Qand, a village in Holunchekan Rural District in the Central District of Qasr-e Qand County, Sistan and Baluchestan Province, Iran